The following lists events that happened during 1987 in the Republic of Zaire.

Incumbents 
 President: Mobutu Sese Seko
 Prime Minister: Mabi Mulumba

Events

See also

 Zaire
 History of the Democratic Republic of the Congo

References

Sources

 
1980s in Zaire
Years of the 20th century in Zaire
Zaire
Zaire